Nils Brage Nordlander (29 October 1919 – August 2009) was a Swedish speciality doctor attached to the Hospital of Ulleråker. As a politician, he served as the president of the county council of Uppsala, representing the Swedish People's Party, the predecessor of the Liberals.

Nils Brage Nordlander was active in the establishment of the Museum of Medical History in Uppsala along with his wife Brita Nordlander, to which he also became an important donor.

Biography
Nils Brage Nordlander was born on 29 October 1919 as a son to statutory auditor John August Nordlander and Lisa Johansson. He received his Bachelor of Medical Sciences from Stockholm University and Licentiate of Medical Sciences from Uppsala University, and served as 1st Curator of the Södermanlands-Nerikes nation in Uppsala.

He married Brita Nordlander (born Redin) in 1946, a teacher and politician.

Nils Brage Nordlander died in August 2009.

Medicine

Nils Brage Nordlander, a recurrent contributor to medical magazines such as Läkartidningen, was a medical pioneer in studies both on dieting and the restless legs syndrome. Besides being an early prominent advocator of the low-carbohydrate diet as "one of the leading experts on dieting", according to Hemmets Veckotidning (1966), he was also a pioneer in the study of the restless legs syndrome in 1953, treating patients by injection of iron according to his casual theory attributed to iron deficiency.

Nils Brage Nordlander was active in the establishment of the Museum of Medical History in Uppsala along with his wife Brita Nordlander, to which he also became an important donor.

Politics
Besides his medical research, he was also a frequent contributor to the debate in daily newspapers such as Upsala Nya Tidning in his role as politician, including serving as president of the county council of Uppsala, representing the Swedish People's Party, the predecessor of the Liberals.

Distinctions
 : Recipient of the H.M The King's Medal, Gold in 8th Size with the sash of the Royal Order of the Seraphim
  Honorary Doctorate by the Faculty of Medicine at Uppsala University, Sweden (31 May 1985)

Bibliography
Including anthologies.
 HÖRDE NI Nr 43 april 1954 (Swedish Radio)
 Husmorslexikon
 Matlexikon. Del I. Recept och praktisk matlagning.
 Sjukt i huset (1959)
 Kom och banta med oss N&K 1962, 64 p.
 Banta: de 5 bästa sätten
 Rikssalstapeterna i Uppsala slott (1992)
 Mätt på rätt sätt: råd till den som inte vill vara fet
 Friskare liv
 Människan: om människokroppen och dess arbete
 Matlexikon
 Det ska aldrig få hända mig!: om barn till alkoholister
 Sjuka själar, krassliga kroppar

References

1919 births
2009 deaths
20th-century Swedish physicians
20th-century Swedish politicians
21st-century Swedish physicians
21st-century Swedish politicians
Liberals (Sweden) politicians
Local politicians in Sweden
Low-carbohydrate diet advocates
Stockholm University alumni
Swedish medical researchers
Swedish neurologists
Uppsala University alumni
Academic staff of Uppsala University